Batgirl is a DC Comics superheroine character, the alter-ego of several characters in the Batman fictional milieu.

Batgirl or bat girl or variation, may also refer to:

Arts and entertainment

DC Comics 
 Batgirl (film), a cancelled HBO Max film in the DCEU film franchise
 Batgirl, a DC Comics comic book title featuring the titular character Batgirl
 Batgirl: Year One, a 9-issue comic book miniseries from DC Comics featuring the titular superheroine
 "Bat-Girl!", issue 139 of Batman from 1961 in comics
 Bette Kane, the late-1950s/early-1960s Bat-Girl
 Barbara Gordon, the traditional DC Comics Batgirl alter-ego, starting in the late-1960s
 Cassandra Cain, the early-2000s Batgirl
 Stephanie Brown (character), the circa-2010 Batgirl

Television
 "Bat Girl", a 1998 TV episode of Freaky Stories
 "Bat Girl", a 2012 TV episode of The Worst Witch, see List of The Worst Witch (2017 TV series) episodes
 "Bat Girl", a 2021 episode of Big City Greens, see List of Big City Greens episodes

Other entertainment
 Bat Girl, a fictional character from the 1924 film London After Midnight (film)
 Bat Girl, a 1967 Hong Kong film
 "Bat Girl", a 2014 song by Yoon Jong-shin and Younha

Sports
 Batgirl (baseball), a person who assists in management of equipment on a baseball field, typically delivering and getting bats
 bat-girl.com, a sports blog written by baseball commentator Anne Ursu
 Batsgirl, a girl batter (baseball)
 Batsgirl, a girl batter (cricket)

Other uses
 A girl vampire
 A female bat (Chiroptera)

 A girl serving as a batman in the military

See also

 Bat (disambiguation)
 Girl (disambiguation)
 
 
 Batwoman (disambiguation)
 Bat boy (disambiguation)
 Batman (disambiguation)
 Batter (disambiguation)